Ren railway station is a railway station in Nagaur district, Rajasthan. Its code is REN. It serves Ren village. The station consists of a single platform. Passenger, Express and Superfast trains halt here.

References

Railway stations in Nagaur district
Jodhpur railway division